Benoît Tréluyer (born 7 December 1976) is a French professional racing driver.

Early career
Beginning his motorsport career in motocross and karting, Alençon-born Tréluyer switched to single-seaters in Formula Renault Campus for 1995. He was a race winner in the French Formula Renault championship in 1996, finishing sixth overall in 1997 before moving up to domestic F3 for ‘98. He would go on to finish ninth overall in his rookie season and third the following year, and also claimed the European Formula Three Cup at the Pau Circuit in 1999.

Formula Nippon and Super GT
Tréluyer relocated to Asia to contest the Japanese F3 category in 2000, a title he would win in 2001 title with 15 wins and 13 pole positions from 19 races. He also finished second in the blue riband Macau GP and third in the F3 World Cup in Korea.

In 2002 he graduated from F3 to Formula Nippon, only racing in 5 rounds. He finished second overall the following season and finally claiming the title in 2006 with 4 wins from 9 races. He would take two more runner-up finishes in the championship (2007 and 2009) before calling time on his single-seater career to focus on sportscar competition.

Throughout his time in Nippon Tréluyer also competed in Japan's GT category having debuted in the series during the 2001 season aboard a Dome Project Honda NSX. From next year, he drove for Nissan-backed teams for ten years. He would win the title in 2008 alongside co-driver Satoshi Motoyama and also finished as runner-up in 2011, his final year in Japan before making the factory Audi squad his sole racing priority.

Endurance racing and Le Mans
Tréluyer made his Le Mans 24 Hours debut in 2002, claiming a GT class podium in the Chrysler Viper he shared with fellow countrymen Jonathan Cochet and Jean-Philippe Belloc. He would return to the race in 2004 to contest the premier LMP1 class with legendary French outfit  Pescarolo Sport, taking a best finish of fourth overall. During the 2009 race Tréluyer was involved in a frightening accident that saw him transported to the infield care centre at the Circuit de la Sarthe. He was treated and released without serious injury.

In 2010 he joined the factory Audi squad alongside André Lotterer and Marcel Fässler. The trio took second position in their maiden 24 Hours together before triumphing in the 2011 race, holding off the charging Peugeot cars as their fellow Audis both exited in terrifying accidents. They would retain their crown in 2012 piloting the first hybrid-powered car to claim victory at La Sarthe. Tréluyer fell ill on the morning of the race, forcing him to swap shifts with Fässler, but recovered to play his part in the triumph.

Further wins in Great Britain and Bahrain, as well as podiums in Brazil, Japan and China, saw the trio go on to claim the 2012 FIA World Endurance Championship drivers' title, becoming the first recipients of an officially sanctioned world sportscar title in two decades. Afterwards Tréluyer revealed that he was "very proud to finish ahead of Tom Kristensen and Allan McNish who are fantastic drivers."

In March 2013 Tréluyer, along with Audi team-mates Fässler and Oliver Jarvis, took victory at the 12 Hours of Sebring. The Frenchman will defend his world title in the 2013 FIA World Endurance Championship alongside regular partners Lotterer and Fässler.

Career highlights
 3-times winner of the Le Mans 24 Hours (2011, 2012, 2014)
 FIA World Endurance Champion (2012)
 Winner of 8 other FIA World Endurance races from 2012 to 2015.
 12 Hours of Sebring winner (2013)
 Japanese Super GT Champion (2008)
 Formula Nippon Champion (2006)
 Japanese Formula Three Champion (2001)
 Pau Grand Prix winner (1999)

Racing record

Complete JGTC/Super GT results
(key) (Races in bold indicate pole position) (Races in italics indicate fastest lap)

Complete Formula Nippon results

24 Hours of Le Mans results

Complete FIA World Endurance Championship results

External links

 
 

1976 births
Living people
Sportspeople from Alençon
French racing drivers
French Formula Renault 2.0 drivers
French Formula Three Championship drivers
Japanese Formula 3 Championship drivers
British Formula Three Championship drivers
Formula Nippon drivers
Super GT drivers
24 Hours of Le Mans drivers
24 Hours of Le Mans winning drivers
European Le Mans Series drivers
American Le Mans Series drivers
FIA World Endurance Championship drivers
Blancpain Endurance Series drivers
24 Hours of Spa drivers
12 Hours of Sebring drivers
Deutsche Tourenwagen Masters drivers
Audi Sport drivers
Mugen Motorsports drivers
Nismo drivers
Oreca drivers
Team Joest drivers
Phoenix Racing drivers
W Racing Team drivers
Pescarolo Sport drivers
Signature Team drivers
Comtoyou Racing drivers